The 2014 KBS Drama Awards, presented by Korean Broadcasting System (KBS), took place on December 31, 2014 in Yeouido, Seoul. It was hosted by actors Kim Sang-kyung, Park Min-young and Seo In-guk.

Winners and nominees

References

External links
 2014 KBS 연기대상 
 

KBS Drama Awards
KBS Drama Awards
KBS Drama Awards